Heartdrum is a publishing imprint of the English-language publishing house HarperCollins that specializes in children's books by North American Indigenous authors.

Audience 
Heartdrum was launched in 2019 and is an imprint of the American publishing house HarperCollins Publishers dedicated to Indigenous stories. With an emphasis on Indian Country and the fortitude of young Indigenous heroes, the imprint is by Native American authors who write for youngsters aged 8 and up.

Notable books 
Heartdrum has published several award winning children's books.
 Rain Is Not My Indian Name by Cynthia Leitich Smith (February 2021)
 Jo Jo Makoons series by Dawn Quigley, illustrated by Tara Audibert (May 2021)
 The Summer of Bitter and Sweet by Jen Ferguson (May 2022)

See also 
 HarperCollins
 Books in the United States
 List of writers from peoples indigenous to the Americas

References

External links 
 

Publishing companies of the United States
Children's book publishers
Book publishing companies based in New York City
HarperCollins books